Level, Maryland is a small unincorporated community in Harford County, Maryland.

Level is home to a few locally-notable landmarks, such as Level Volunteer Fire Company and Hopewell Church. 

A few scenes of House of Cards, a Netflix original series, were filmed in Level, Maryland.

References

Maryland articles without infoboxes
Unincorporated communities in Harford County, Maryland